The Audie Award for Fantasy is one of the Audie Awards presented annually by the Audio Publishers Association (APA). It awards excellence in narration, production, and content for a fantasy audiobook released in a given year. It has been awarded since 2012.

Winners and finalists

2010s

2020s

References

External links 

 Audie Award winners
 Audie Awards official website

Fantasy
Fantasy fiction articles
Awards established in 2012
English-language literary awards